Arvo Aalto (born 13 July 1932) is a Finnish politician who headed the Communist Party between 1984 and 1988. He also served as the labour minister from 1977 to 1981.

Early life and education
Aalto was born in Rovaniemi on 13 July 1932. He graduated from Sirola Institute in 1956 and also, received education at Moscow Party School in the period 1961–1962.

Career
Aalto was a trade unionist. He joined the Communist Party in 1951. He was its secretary in Lapland in 1956 and part of the progressive group in the party. He was elected as the general secretary of the party under party chairman Aarne Saarinen in 1969 replacing Ville Pessi in the post. Pessi had resigned from the post due to internal conflicts in the party. Aalto served as the general secretary until 1984 with some interruptions. During his term the leadership of the Communist Party was progressive and revised the manifesto of the party.

Aalto was the minister of labour from 1977 to 1981. He was replaced by Jouko Kajanoja in the post. In June 1984 Aalto was elected as the chairman of the Communist Party obtaining 183 votes against 163 votes in favor of the former chairman Jouko Kajanoja. During his tenure Aalto visited China in January 1987 becoming the highest ranking Finnish communist to visit China in more than 20 years. Aalto headed the party until May 1988 when he and the politburo resigned due to economic crisis experienced by the party.

Personal life and views
Aalto has two daughters. While serving as the chairman of the Communist Party he was not so close to the Soviet Communist Party. He does not support the NATO membership of Finland.

References

External links

1932 births
Living people
Communist Party of Finland politicians
Ministers of Labour of Finland
People from Rovaniemi
Leaders of political parties in Finland
Finnish trade unionists